Loran Township is located in Stephenson County, Illinois. As of the 2010 census, its population was 1,442 and it contained 575 housing units.

Communities and landmarks 

 Pearl City, an incorporated village 
 Yellow Creek, an unincorporated village
 Mill Grove, a former community
 Sabin Cemetery

Geography
Loran is Township 26 North, Range 6 East of the Fourth Principal Meridian.

Demographics

References

External links
City-data.com
Stephenson County Official Site

Townships in Stephenson County, Illinois
Townships in Illinois